Indweller is the fifth and last studio album by the English group Quintessence. Maha Dev and Shiva Shankar Jones had been fired from the band prior to the recording of this album, making this the only album on which they do not feature.

Track listing
Side one
 "Jesus My Life" – 3:38
 "Butterfly Music" – 1:02
 "It's All the Same" – 7:04
 "Indweller" – 2:29
 "Holy Roller" – 4:12
 "Portable Realm" – 1:29
Side two
 "Sai Baba" – 3:24
 "On the Other Side of the Wall" – 3:35
 "Dedication" – 2:44
 "Bliss Trip" – 6:19
 "Mother of the Universe" – 1:45

Personnel
 Sambhu Babaji – bass guitar
 Jake Milton – drums
 Allan Mostert – lead guitar
 Raja Ram – flute

References 

1972 albums
Quintessence (English band) albums
RCA Records albums
albums recorded at Morgan Sound Studios